Uppuguda is a part of the Old City, Hyderabad, Hyderabad, India.

About Uppuguda
Uppuguda is one of the oldest suburbs of old city of Hyderabad. Uppuguda (also known as Huppuguda, which is the name of its Railway Station) is located 3.5 km from the Charminar monument, and 2.5 km from Defence Research Development Laboratories (DRDL). Uppuguda, previously considered a village, now falls under the jurisdiction of Bandlaguda Mandal.  Uppuguda is surrounded by Ex-servicemen colony, Arundathi Nagar Colony, Rajiv Gandhi Colony, Shivaji Nagar, Tanaji Nagar, Chatrimet, Lalitha Bagh, Bhaiyya Lal Nagar, Ambika Nagar, Chatrinaka, Tovvala Bavi, Reddy Basthi, Kandikal Gate, Rakshapuram Colony, Shankarbagh, Saibaba Nagar, Mukkera Basthi, Harijan Basthi, DRDL, Kanchanbagh, Rakshapuram Colony, Riyasath Nagar, Laldarwaza and Gowlipura. Highly populated and popularly known for its slum areas, Uppuguda is now progressing towards erection of multi-storeyed buildings and commercial complexes. Nearby Cinema Theatres to Uppuguda are Yadagiri 70mm located in Santoshnagar and Sudha 70mm near Chandulal Bela of Shah-Ali Banda.

Housing in Uppuguda is relatively affordable when compared to other parts of the old city and hence, it is highly populated. Among 150 wards of Greater Hyderabad Municipal Corporation (GHMC), Uppuguda is listed on the serial number 27. 
The choice of shops at Uppuguda is very good. Due to narrow roads, Uppuguda looks clumsy and sometimes chaotic because the roads are occupied simultaneously by four-seater sharing autos and the businesses of vegetable and other vendors along the roadside. One example is Uppuguda Station Road.

Three-wheelers are most common transport in Uppuguda and near janda is the place to pickups or drop.
There also has one of the best auto union, which will support all the auto workers.

Public transport
Uppuguda is connected by buses run by TSRTC, since a Bus Depot is close by, it is well connected. Buses that run are 75A, 75U, 8U,2U, 9M, 72L and 67B.

MMTS services are available from Huppuguda Railway Station. Local Trains towards Umdanagar (Shamshabad), Mahabubnagar, Vikarabad, Nanded, Kurnool, Nizamabad, Guntur and Lingampally make a halt the passenger trains only here at Huppuguda Railway Station and Express Trains like Venkatadri Express, Tirupathi-Hazrath Nizamuddin, Bangalore Express, Chennai Egmore, Bangalore-Hazrath Nizamuddin etc., pass through this station.

4-seater local autos towards charminar are most frequently available and many commuters rely upon either MMTS or Auto Services than newly introduced mini buses from Uppuguda to save time and cost.

Temples, masjids and places to visit
Mangalmukhi Hanuman Temple, Mahankali Temple, Narasimha Swamy Temple, Kalika Devi Temple, Lalithambika Devi Mandir, Nalla Pochamma Temple, Oora Pochamma Temple, Hanuman Nagar Anjaneya Swamy Temple, Shivalayam and Potha Linganna Temple, Panta Missama.

Shirdi Sai Baba Temple is under construction and shivajinagar shiva lingam Temple is under reconstruction.

Masjid-E-Bilal in Ex-servicemen colony Uppuguda, more than 50 years old place in Uppuguda.

Chatrimet is a burial ground which is under the supervision of Archaeological Survey of India is of historical prominence but now is barren.

Neighbourhoods in Hyderabad, India